Reem Al Numery (born 1996) is a children's rights activist in Yemen.  Known for resisting child marriage, she was honored by U.S. Secretary of State Hillary Clinton on March 11, 2009, with the International Women of Courage Award. She was listed in the Time Magazine 2010 100 Most Influential People in the World.

At age 12, at the end of her school year, Al Numery was forced to marry her 30-year-old cousin.  She refused, and was bound and gagged by her father for the ceremony.  She described to the U.S. Consul how her husband raped her in order to consummate the marriage.

After two attempts at suicide and a great deal of international attention she was finally granted a divorce by a Yemeni judge. As of 2010 Al Numery lived with her mother.

References

Living people
Children's rights activists
1996 births
Child marriage in Yemen
21st-century Yemeni women
21st-century Yemeni people
Recipients of the International Women of Courage Award